Cape Collier is a broad ice-covered cape on the east coast of Palmer Land, about midway between the south end of Hearst Island and Cape Boggs. It was discovered in 1940 by members of the United States Antarctic Service who explored this coast by land and from the air from East Base, and named for Zadick Collier, machinist at the East Base.

References
 

Headlands of Palmer Land